The Stefan Starzyński monument (Pomnik Stefana Starzyńskiego) in Bank Square in Warsaw is one of two Warsaw monuments dedicated to the memory of the former President of Warsaw, Stefan Starzyński. It is the work of sculptor Andrzej Renes.

It is on the eastern side of the square, on the sidewalk in front of the Błękitny Wieżowiec (Blue Skyscraper). The unveiling of the monument took place on 10 November 1993, to celebrate the hundredth year of the birth of President.

The statue is cast in bronze and set on a granite pedestal. The intention of the author was to present the form of Starzyński leaning over a map of the city of Warsaw.

The second monument

The second Warsaw monument to Starzyński, by sculptor Ludwika Nitschowa, was unveiled on 17 December 1980 in the Saxon Garden. In 2008 it was transferred to the Primary School No. 143, Stefan Wyszynski on Aleja Stanów Zjednoczonych (United States Avenue). The unveiling of the monument at this new location took place on 15 September 2008.

Monuments and memorials in Warsaw
1993 establishments in Poland
1993 sculptures